The Secret Agent (German: Der geheime Agent) is a 1924 German silent film directed by Erich Schönfelder and starring Eva May, Lucie Höflich and Carl Lamac.

The film's art direction was by Erich Zander. It was shot at the Weissensee Studios in Berlin.

Cast
Eva May as Duchess
Lucie Höflich as Duchess's mother
Carl Lamac as Duke
Max Gülstorff as minister  
Ernst Behmer as minister  
Leonhard Haskel as minister 
Eugen Rex as servant
Karl Platen as builder
Karl Beckersachs as Marquis  
Trude Berliner as Zofe

References

External links

Films of the Weimar Republic
Films directed by Erich Schönfelder
German silent feature films
National Film films
German black-and-white films
Films shot at Weissensee Studios